USS Mohawk may refer to the following ships of the United States Navy:

, a U.S. Navy ship in the War of 1812.
, a U.S. Navy screw steamship launched in 1853.
, a U.S. Navy tug acquired in 1898.

See also
, a U.S. Revenue cutter launched in 1904.
, a U.S. Coast Guard cutter launched in 1934.
, a U.S. Coast Guard launched in 1989.
, a U.S. Navy reserve fleet ocean tug launched in 1980.

United States Navy ship names